Alan Winn (born February 18, 1996) is an American soccer player who currently plays for United Premier Soccer League side Beaman United FC.

Career

College and amateur
Winn was born in Dallas, Texas and grew up in nearby Garland, Texas. He played his college career at University of North Carolina where he played mainly as a winger or forward. Winn played 77 matches for the Tarheels, starting 62. He scored 23 goals and had 14 assists.

Winn played for National Premier Soccer League side Carolina RailHawks NPSL in 2016 and Premier Development League side Tobacco Road FC in 2017.

Following his release from Memphis, Winn joined Nashville-based United Premier Soccer League club Beaman United FC for the 2022 season.

Professional
On January 19, 2018, the Colorado Rapids selected Winn with the 25th overall pick of the 2018 MLS SuperDraft.

On February 9, 2018, Nashville SC announced that Winn had signed with the club. Winn's contract with Nashville expired following the 2020 season.

On August 28, 2021, Winn signed with USL Championship side Memphis 901.

References

External links
 
 
 
 

Living people
1996 births
American soccer players
Association football forwards
Colorado Rapids draft picks
Nashville SC (2018–19) players
North Carolina Tar Heels men's soccer players
People from Garland, Texas
Soccer players from Texas
Tobacco Road FC players
USL League Two players
USL Championship players
Nashville SC players
Major League Soccer players
Memphis 901 FC players
United Premier Soccer League players